Four Crosses Football Club is a Welsh football team based in the village of Four Crosses, Montgomeryshire, in northern Powys, Wales. They play in the Central Wales Northern Division, which is in the fourth tier of the Welsh football league system.

History
Four Crosses FC came into existence ahead of the 1975–76 Montgomeryshire League season and were Division Two champions in 1979–80 and Division One runners-up in 1984–85.   The club changed their identity to Llanymynech Rovers for the 1989–90 campaign.

Honours

Mid Wales Football League Division Two – Runners-up: 2011–12; 2018–19
Montgomeryshire League Division One – Champions: 2004–05
Montgomeryshire League Division One – Runners-up: 1984–85
Montgomeryshire League Division Two – Champions: 1979–80, 2003–04
Montgomeryshire Challenge Cup – Winners: 2017–18
Emrys Morgan Cup – Runners-up: 2017–18

References

External links
Club official Twitter

Football clubs in Wales
Mid Wales Football League clubs
Sport in Powys
Ardal Leagues clubs